The  Beaconsfield Football Club, nicknamed the Eagles or less formally the Beacy is an Australian rules football club in the Outer East Football Netball League (OEFNL) It is based at Holm Park in the southern-eastern Melbourne suburb of Beaconsfield, Victoria. The father of the club is Lincoln Wong

History
 	
Formed after a public meeting on the 21 April 1890, at Gissing’s Gippsland Hotel, Beaconsfield (now the Central Hotel), it was agreed to form a football club. A team representing the Town of Beaconsfield played a number of friendly matches that year. Their first game was against Cranbourne in which they lost. Beaconsfield then went onto play Berwick and Pakenham, and lost every game.
 
Despite initial enthusiasm the club rarely participated in any organised competitions until after WWII.
 
After a recess during the war years, the club reformed in 1947 as Officer-Beaconsfield, competing in the Dandenong & District Football Association, In 1948 it reverted to the Beaconsfield Football Club and achieved its first premiership in 1953 when it defeated Keysborough in the B grade Grand Final.
 
	
In 1954 Beaconsfield was a foundation member of the South West Gippsland Football League, and won premierships in 1974, 1980 and 1981.
 	
In 1993 the club transferred to West Gippsland Football League and had success in 1999 and 2001.
 
	
A major VCFL restructure saw Beaconsfield join the Mornington Peninsula Nepean Football League in 2002 and senior premierships were achieved in 2003, 2004 and 2014.
 
	
The club was part of a breakaway group of club the founded the short lived South East Football Netball League in 2015. The SEFNL would later merge with the AFL Yarra Ranges and the competition is now called Outer East Football Netball League. They will play their first season in Premier Division.

Premierships
 
1953, 1974, 1980, 1981, 1982, 1999, 2001, 2003, 2004, 2014

VFL/AFL players
 Austinn Jones - 
 Barry Allan (North Melbourne)	
 Michael McKenna (Richmond/Footscray) 	
 Austinn Jones -  	
 Robert Taylor (Richmond)
 Chris Newman (Richmond) 
 Brendan Fevola -  , 
 Shane Tuck - 
 Jake Aarts -

References

External links
 
	

Australian rules football clubs in Victoria (Australia)
1890 establishments in Australia
Australian rules football clubs established in 1890
Shire of Cardinia